One Live Night is a 1996 semi-acoustic live album by  heavy metal band Dokken. The reunited Dokken recorded the album before a live audience at The Strand, an intimate concert venue in Redondo Beach, California, on December 13, 1994, and prior to their 1995 tour. The album went virtually unheard at the time of its release. Released at the time when grunge and alternative rock were dominating mainstream rock music, MTV had no interest in featuring glam metal acts; so Dokken decided to do their own "unplugged" album. This intimate performance included versions of "Tooth and Nail", "Into the Fire" and "Alone Again", as well as covers of the Beatles' "Nowhere Man" and Emerson, Lake & Palmer's "From the Beginning".

One Live Night was also released on VHS and later DVD.

Track listing
"Into the Fire" – 5:22
"Unchain the Night" – 6:48
"The Maze" – 5:44
"Nothing Left to Say" – 4:44
"From the Beginning" (Emerson, Lake & Palmer cover) – 4:59
"Tooth and Nail" – 4:43
"Just Got Lucky" – 5:07
"I Will Remember" – 4:16
"Alone Again" – 7:20
"In My Dreams" – 4:34
"Nowhere Man" (The Beatles cover) – 2:55
"It's Not Love" – 6:03

Personnel

Dokken
Don Dokken - vocals, acoustic guitar, slide guitar, acoustic bass guitar
George Lynch - electric and acoustic guitar, 12-string acoustic guitar
Jeff Pilson - acoustic bass guitar, acoustic guitar, piano, vocals
Mick Brown - percussion, vocals

Production
Wyn Davis - producer, engineer, mixing at Total Access Recording, Redondo Beach, California

References

External links
Dokken One Live Night

Dokken live albums
1996 live albums
CMC International live albums
JVC Records live albums
Dokken video albums
1996 video albums
Live video albums